Martin Ernstsen (born 16 August 1982) is a Norwegian comics artist.

He issued his first comic on Jippi Comics in 2007, publishing seven titles until 2014. He then penned two children's books on Cappelen Damm, Hvor er Albert? (2013) and Filip flipper ut (2015). In 2019 he issued the graphic novel Sult, an adaptation of Knut Hamsun's Hunger. For this he won the Brage Prize, open class, the same year.

References

1982 births
Living people
People from Akershus
Norwegian comics artists
Norwegian children's writers